Chrysoritis uranus, the Uranus opal, is a lycaenid butterfly that is found only in South Africa.

The wingspan is 24–30 mm for males and 25–32 mm for females. Flight period has several broods from October to April.

The larvae feed on Centella, Aspalathus, and Zygophyllum species. They are attended to by Crematogaster liengmei ants.

Subspecies
Chrysoritis uranus uranus – South Africa: Western Cape
Chrysoritis uranus schoemani (Heath, 1994) – South Africa: Western Cape

References

Butterflies described in 1962
Chrysoritis
Endemic butterflies of South Africa